Cacama pygmaea is a species of cicada in the family Cicadidae. It is found in Central America.

References

Further reading

 

Articles created by Qbugbot
Insects described in 2011
Cryptotympanini